"Head Full of Steam" is a song by the Australian alternative rock band The Go-Betweens that was released as the second single from their fourth album Liberty Belle and the Black Diamond Express. It was released as a 7" and 12" vinyl single on the Beggars Banquet label in the United Kingdom in May 1986, with "Don't Let Him Come Back" as the B-side. In Australia it was released in 1987 by True Tone Records, with "Little Joe" as the B-Side.

The single version is markedly different from the album recording, with added keyboards, and a middle eighth where Forster asks, "Can I come to your place, and can I wash your hair?"

Video
The video was a take-off of Prince's recent video for "Kiss". If featured Forster cavorting in a mid-riff top and flares and McLennan in drag. Forster later wrote that, "This was weird and gave the video an odd edge. I didn't know what Grant was thinking. A team of psychologists at a lakeside retreat outside Vienna would have to work that one out."

Critical reception
Ned Raggett at Allmusic states ""Head Full of Steam" finds the band in relatively jangly mode, the sparkling chime of Robert Forster's and Grant McLennan's guitars almost as close as they ever got to being like the Cocteau Twins. It's an inexact comparison admittedly—there's not any digital delay soundscapes for a start! -- while the steady, fairly relaxed pace of the song and its melody found the band in easy rather than tense, concerned mode. Forster himself is in fine form vocally, his particular plaintive style just nervously worried enough to convey his unsuccessful-but-he'll-try-anyway pursuit of an unrequited love. Thorn's singing is understated but adds a nice bit of low-key contrast and flair."

In Jason McNeil's review of Liberty Belle and the Black Diamond Express in Popmatters he states the "lone drawback might be the laissez faire attitude on “Head Full of Steam”, a track whose title misrepresents it totally." Alternately, The Guardian thought, "Its softer, janglepop sound showed that shifting towards simplification could work in their favour."
 
Treblezine's Jeff Terich states that it is "another song that bears similarities to The Smiths. But it’s Grant McLennan’s voice that gives it away each time. Sounding like a cross between Robyn Hitchcock and Tom Verlaine, his voice is no less unmistakable than Morrissey’s.."

Australian musician David McCormack (Custard) believes that "It’s a classic. It’s mysterious but it’s got such a great euphoric chorus. My fascination with this particular song is also about when I discovered it – whenever I put it on, it transports me back to Brisbane in the mid-80s, which is where I first heard it at a friend’s house. I also recommend checking out the video which features Robert doing his best Prince impersonation."

Track listing

Original 7" Vinyl release

Original 12" Vinyl release

Release history

Credits
The Go-Betweens
 Grant McLennan — vocals, lead guitar, loops, treatments
 Lindy Morrison — drums
 Robert Forster — vocals, rhythm guitar
 Robert Vickers — bass guitar

Additional musicians
 Tracey Thorn — backing vocals ("Head Full of Steam")
 Dean B Speedwell — keyboards ("Don't Let Him Come Back")

Production
 Producer — The Go-Betweens, Richard Preston 
 Artwork — Mick Lowe
 Remix — Mike Pela

References

External links
 [ "Head Full of Steam"] @ AllMusic 
 "Head Full of Steam" @ MusicBrainz
 "Head Full of Steam" @ Discogs
 Video

1986 singles
The Go-Betweens songs
1986 songs
Beggars Banquet Records singles
Songs written by Grant McLennan
Songs written by Robert Forster (musician)